Kevin Kern may refer to:

Kevin Kern, American pianist
Kevin Kern (actor), Broadway performer